Vritti (Vrutti)  (Sanskrit: वृत्ति, Harvard-Kyoto: vṛtti, Gujarati: વૃત્તિ), means "streams of consciousness", it is also a technical term used in yoga meant to indicate mental awareness against disturbances in the medium of consciousness. Vritti can be taken as a catch-all term for any content in consciousness, where consciousness is regarded as a medium or container for any possible mental content. The scope of the idea is very broad, referring not only to thoughts and perceptions experienced in a normal waking state, but also to all super-physical perceptions, such as dreams or in any altered state of consciousness. Vritti has also been translated as "waves" or "ripples" of disturbance upon the otherwise calm waters of the mind. The classical definition of yoga as stated in the Yoga Sutras is to calm the waves and return, or reunite (yoga = union) mind to its calm state, or samadhi.

Usage in yoga
The concept of vritti is central to the main definition of yoga given in Sutra 1.2 of the Yoga Sutras of Patanjali: "yogasch chitta vritti nirodha".  I. K. Taimni translates this as: "Yoga is the silencing of the modifications of the mind". Central to the definition of yoga is the concept of vritti as a modification of the mind, which it is the intent of yogic practices to silence.

In the context of yoga, the presence of vrittis in consciousness is regarded as impediments to enlightenment. Swami Vivekananda uses the metaphor of a lake to illustrate this concept: “[Chitta] is the mind-stuff, and Vrttis are the waves and ripples rising in it when external causes impinge on it. The bottom of the lake we cannot see, because its surface is covered with ripples. It is only possible when the ripples have subsided, and the water is calm, for us to catch a glimpse of the bottom. If the water is muddy, the bottom will not be seen; if the water is agitated all the time, the bottom will not be seen. If the water is clear, and there are no waves, we shall see the bottom. That bottom of the lake is our own true Self; the lake is the Chitta, and the waves are the Vrttis.”

Thus it is the goal of yoga to "still" or "silence' the modifications in consciousness, the vrittis, and thereby set the stage to learn the technique of samadhi, an advanced mental method for achieving enlightenment.

According to Swami Niranjanananda Saraswati
In the context of Hinduism and yoga, vrittis refer to different tendencies, or psycho-physical propensities, which give scope for the mind to express a variety of feelings and emotions. Hindu texts describe samskaras to be a result of past actions and experiences that have left an imprint on the mind. The expression of samskaras gives rise to vrittis, which collectively represent the behaviour that makes most people different from each other: difference in desires and repulsions; in predispositions and complexes.

Connections made to modern science
According to some modern descriptions, a vritti triggers the glands associated with that particular propensity to secrete the corresponding hormones. Usually this is done subconsciously, although yogis endeavour to control and master the expression of their vritties, through the practice of asanas (postures) and sadhana (meditation), leading to the attainment of siddhis (occult powers), and giving clear passage for the kundalini to rise.

Vrittis need not be considered confined to the esoteric experiences of advanced yogis. The seat of the vritti of love, or prema in Sanskrit, is the heart; the seat of the vritti of fear (bhaya) is the stomach. The sensation of feeling one's heart swoon, or "getting butterflies" corresponds to the physical expression of these psychic propensities. Each vritti may have a negative or positive expression. Even love, when over-expressed, leads to intense possessiveness. The goal of the yogi is thus not to suppress, or annul their vrittis, rather it is to find a harmonious balance, and ultimately, to channelize these tendencies inward.

As a word, vritti means literally vortex (of consciousness), or "circular activity with no beginning and no end".

Vrittis of Tantric Chakras
Below are the Vrittis associated with each of the Tantric Chakras:
 Muladhara: greatest joy, natural pleasure, delight in controlling passion, and blissfulness in concentration.
 Swadhisthana: affection, pitilessness, feeling of all-destructiveness, delusion, disdain and suspicion.
 Manipura: spiritual ignorance, thirst, jealousy, treachery, shame, fear, disgust, delusion, foolishness and sadness.
 Anahata: lustfulness, fraudulence, indecision, repentance, hope, anxiety, longing, impartiality, arrogance, incompetency, discrimination and defiance.
 Vishuddha: communication, calmness, purity, a melodious voice, and the command of speech and mantras.
 Ajna:centre of spiritual energy between the two eyebrows.
 Sahasrara:centre of spiritual energy at the crown of the head.

See also
 Yoga
 Tantra
 Mysticism
 Vāsanā

References

External links
 The Vrittis by Swami Niranjanananda Saraswati

Hindu philosophical concepts
Yoga concepts
Sanskrit words and phrases